was a Japanese film director,  screenwriter, and actor who was one of the major directors of the silent era in Japan.

Career
Born in Tokyo, Murata started out as a shingeki actor on the stage. Murata's troupe appeared in the first "pure films" directed by Norimasa Kaeriyama at Tenkatsu in 1918. On the recommendation of the playwright Kaoru Osanai, he then joined Shochiku in 1920 and participated in the  actors school Osanai ran there. He ended up directing Souls on the Road (1921), a ground breaking reformist film that is one of the few films surviving from that era. Murata later moved to Nikkatsu, where he directed such critical hits as Seisaku's Wife (1924) and The Street Juggler (1925) which were "important in establishing the form of Japanese films about contemporary life." He later worked at Shinkō Kinema. He started up the important journal, Eiga kagaku kenkyū, in 1928 with Kiyohiko Ushihara, and helped found the Directors Guild of Japan in 1936, becoming its first president. Often battling illness, he died suddenly in 1937.

Selected filmography

As actor
The Glow of Life (1918)

As director
 Souls on the Road (路上の霊魂 Rojō no reikon) (1921)
 Seisaku's Wife (清作の妻 Seisaku no Tsuma) (1924)
 The Street Juggler (街の手品師 Machi no tejinashi) (1925)
 Nichirin (日輪 The Sun) (1926)
 Muteki (霧笛 The Foghorn) (1934)

References

External links 

Japanese film directors
Japanese male actors
1894 births
1937 deaths
People from Tokyo
Silent film directors
20th-century Japanese screenwriters